Kelidar is a novel written by Mahmoud Dowlatabadi in Persian. The novel consists of 10 books in 5 volumes. The book was written in 15 years, and includes Iranian folkloric themes. Kelidar has been translated into different languages. Kelidar refers to the name of a mountain and a village in Khorasan, where the events of the novel took place.

Plot

The story is about the life of a Kurdish family in Sabzevar, faced with the hostility of neighboring villagers despite cultural similarities. It is set against the highly charged political climate in Iran after World War II, between 1946 and 1949.

Characters

"Illustrating the tragic fate of the Iranian peasantry and the nomadic tribes in a period of the power politics,"  and based on actual events, the novel follows the trials and tribulations of the Kalmiši family, and is peopled with an array of supporting characters.

Mārāl

Mārāl is a young Kurdish girl from the Kalmiši family.

Abdus

Mārāl's father

Delāvar

Mārāl's fiancé

Belqays

Mārāl’s paternal aunt, the matriarch of the family and the linking thread for the novel’s events and characters, and her husband, Kalmiši, have three sons and a daughter:  Khan Moḥammad, Gol-Moḥammad, Beg Moḥammad, and Širu

Sattār

One of the supporters of Gol-Mohammad.

Critiques

From the Reviews

"Kelidar is the longest Persian novel written to date, and surely one of the finest. The present translation is of parts I and 2 only, which are sufficiently self-contained to make for satisfying reading and which also give a good idea of what the whole is like. (...) Doulatabadi's style is that of a traditional Persian storyteller, in that he constructs his tale in a linear fashion, speaks through an omniscient narrator, and uses a balanced mixture of narrative and dialogue. (...) One wishes that readers of English could also experience the pleasures of this novel." - William L. Hanaway, World Literature Today

References 

Iranian novels
1977 novels
Sabzevar
Novels set in Iran
Persian-language novels
Iran in fiction
Books about Iran
Persian-language books
Persian-language literature
Iranian books